Darko Sokolov  (born May 8, 1986) is a Macedonian professional basketball player who plays for EuroNickel 2005 of the Macedonian First League.

Pro career
Since beginning his professional career in 2002, Sokolov has spent the majority of his career playing in the Macedonian First League with Feni Industries, BC Strumica 2005, Rabotnički, MZT Skopje, Vardar, Balkan Steel, Centar and Karpoš Sokoli. He has also made brief stops in Ukraine with Khimik Yuzhny and Bosnia and Herzegovina with KK Bosna.
On 20 November, 2017, he left Karpoš Sokoli due to financial problems.
On November 22, 2017, he signed with MZT Skopje.

National team
Sokolov is also a member of the Macedonian national basketball team.  He competed with the team at Eurobasket 2009 and helped the team to a ninth-place finish, its best ever performance at the time. In 2011, him and his team reached the semi-finals of Eurobasket defeating Lithuania, the host.

References

External links
Darko Sokolov at eurobasket.com
Darko Sokolov at fiba.com

1986 births
Living people
BC Khimik players
KK MZT Skopje players
KK Rabotnički players
Macedonian men's basketball players
Point guards
People from Kočani
KK Bosna Royal players